The 1882 Pennsylvania gubernatorial election occurred on November 7, 1882. Incumbent governor Henry M. Hoyt, a Republican, was not a candidate for re-election. Democratic candidate Robert E. Pattison defeated Republican candidate James A. Beaver to become Governor of Pennsylvania. James Herron Hopkins, Simon Peter Wolverton, and William Watts Hart Davis unsuccessfully sought the Democratic nomination.

Results

References

1882
Pennsylvania
Gubernatorial
November 1882 events